Sulzer Type 2 may refer to:
 British Rail Class 24
 British Rail Class 25